Gippsland (or Gipps' Land) was an electoral district of the Legislative Assembly in the Australian state of Victoria from 1856 to 1859. From 1859, two new districts were created: South Gippsland and North Gippsland.

The district of Gippsland was one of the initial districts of the first Victorian Legislative Assembly, 1856.

Its area was defined as: "Bounded on the South and East by the Sea ; on the North by a Line bearing West from Cape Howe to the Source of the nearest Tributary of the Murray, and by the Alps; and on the West by the Alps and the Counties of Evelyn and Mornington, excepting the Country comprised in the Electoral District of Alberton".

Members for Gippsland

 = by-election
 = resigned

See also
 Gippsland

References

Former electoral districts of Victoria (Australia)
1856 establishments in Australia
1859 disestablishments in Australia
Gippsland (region)